Keratitis–ichthyosis–deafness syndrome (KID syndrome), also known as ichthyosiform erythroderma, corneal involvement, and deafness, presents at birth/infancy and is characterized by progressive corneal opacification, either mild generalized hyperkeratosis or discrete erythematous plaques, and neurosensory deafness.

It is caused by a mutation in connexin 26.

See also 
 Senter syndrome
 Ichthyosis hystrix
 List of cutaneous conditions

References

External links 

Palmoplantar keratodermas
Genodermatoses
Rare syndromes